Yoxall is a ghost town in Bloom Township, Osborne County, Kansas, United States.

History
Yoxall was never a small settlement but only a lone rural post office, organized in 1880 and named after Fred Yoxall, longtime postmaster in the nearby town of Osborne, Kansas. The post office was discontinued in 1894.  There is nothing left of Yoxall.

References

Former populated places in Osborne County, Kansas
Former populated places in Kansas